"Git Along, Little Dogies" is a traditional cowboy ballad, also performed under the title "Whoopie Ti Yi Yo." It is believed to be a variation of a traditional Irish ballad about an old man rocking a cradle. The cowboy adaptation is first mentioned in the 1893 journal of Owen Wister, author of The Virginian. Through Wister's influence, the melody and lyrics were first published in 1910 in John Lomax's Cowboy Songs and Other Frontier Ballads. It is cataloged as Roud Folk Song Index No. 827. Members of the Western Writers of America chose it as one of the Top 100 Western songs of all time.

The "dogies" referred to in the song are runty or orphaned calves.

The earliest commercial recording of the song was by Harry "Mac" McClintock in 1929 (released on Victor V-40016 as "Get Along, Little Doggies"). 

Historian Richard White borrowed a line from the song as the title of his 1991 book It's Your Misfortune and None of My Own: A New History of the American West.

References

External links
The Library of Congress: The American Folklife Center
White, John I., Git Along, Little Dogies: Songs and Songmakers of the American West (Urbana: University of Illinois Press, 1975), referenced in "AFC News," Summer 2006, The Library of Congress: The American Folklife Center
"Guides to Special Collections" in the Music Division of the Library of Congress", Library of Congress

American folk songs
Western music (North America)
American Songbag songs
Year of song unknown
Songs about cattle